Brian Egolf (born September 10, 1976) is an American attorney and politician who has served as a member of the New Mexico House of Representatives since 2009. He has also served as speaker of the House since 2017.

Early life and education 
Egolf was born in Oklahoma City and raised in Santa Fe, New Mexico. He earned a Bachelor of Science degree from Georgetown University and a Juris Doctor from the University of New Mexico School of Law.

Career 
In the 2017 legislative session, Egolf served on the Judiciary, Rules and Order of Business, and Taxation & Revenue Committees.

Egolf championed equal pay for equal work for the women of New Mexico, reduced government corruption through the creation of the New Mexico State Ethics Commission, and passed legislation to penalize the distribution of sensitive images, such as child pornography. As a private practice attorney, Egolf filed suit in New Mexico district court on behalf of a gay couple that was denied a marriage license.

Egolf was considered a potential congressional candidate for the United States House of Representatives in the 2014 election against incumbent Republican Steve Pearce.

Personal life 
Egolf resides in Santa Fe, New Mexico with his family.

References

External links
 
 Biography at Ballotpedia
 Twitter account

1976 births
21st-century American politicians
Georgetown University alumni
Living people
Politicians from Santa Fe, New Mexico
Speakers of the New Mexico House of Representatives
Democratic Party members of the New Mexico House of Representatives
University of New Mexico alumni